Antonio Leoncillo or Antonio Leoncello or Antonio Leoncilli (died c. 1653) was a Roman Catholic prelate who served as Bishop of Termoli (1651–1653?).

Biography
Antonio Leoncillo was born in Spoleto, Italy.
On 3 July 1651, he was appointed during the papacy of Pope Innocent X as Bishop of Termoli.

On 9 July 1651, he was consecrated bishop by Marcantonio Franciotti, Cardinal-Priest of Santa Maria della Pace.

He served as Bishop of Termoli until his death in 1653.

References

External links and additional sources
 (Chronology of Bishops) 
 (Chronology of Bishops) 

17th-century Italian Roman Catholic bishops
Bishops appointed by Pope Innocent X
1653 deaths